Atmospheres is the debut live album by Justin Jarvis. Jesus Culture Music released the album on September 30, 2014. Jarvis worked with Jeremy Edwardson in the production of this album.

Critical reception

Giving the album a seven out of ten review from Cross Rhythms, Joy Farrington writes, "Jarvis clearly sings from a place of passionate love and intimacy which overcomes the slightly repetitive musical backdrop." Mary Nikkel, awarding the album four star for New Release Tuesday, states, "This is a collection of beautiful, heartfelt moments with Jesus." In rating the album three stars at Louder Than the Music, Wesley Huntley says, "This album, is not a typical worship album, and Justin isn’t a typical worship leader."

Track listing

Personnel
Justin Jarvis – vocals, guitars, acoustic guitar, songwriter
Jeffrey Kunde – guitars, acoustic guitar
Tore Kulleseid – guitars, programming
Ian McIntosh – keyboards
Josh Fisher – drums
Jeremy Edwardson – programming, engineer, producer
Andrew Jackson – programming, engineer
Patrick Everett – engineer
Jeremy Griffith/Jeremy S.H. Griffith – audio mixer
Darren Lau – photographer
Kim Walker-Smith – executive producer

Charts

References

2014 live albums
Live Christian music albums